The Barcelona Convention and Statute on Freedom of Transit is an International treaty signed in Barcelona on 20 April 1921; the treaty ensures freedom of transit for various commercial goods across national boundaries.  It was registered in League of Nations Treaty Series on 8 October 1921. It went into effect on 31 October 1922. The convention is still in force at present.

Terms of the convention
The convention merely reaffirmed the statute adopted few days earlier at a League of Nations conference held in Barcelona. Article 1 of the statute defined transit as movement of persons and goods from one sovereign state to another. Article 2 recognized the freedom of sovereign governments to make transit arrangements within their territories. Article 3 prohibited governments from demanding payments for transit rights, except for dues designated to cover operational expenses.  Article 4 made compulsory for governments to apply equal transit dues to all persons, regardless of nationality.  Article 5 permitted governments to prevent the entry into their territories of certain persons or goods for reasons of security. Article 6 permitted governments to refrain from granting transit permission to persons of states that were non-signatories of the convention. Article 7 permitted governments to deviate from the provisions of the statute in cases of national emergency, but required this be done for as brief period as possible. Article 8 allowed exceptions in times of war. Article 9 stated that none of its provisions can contradict obligations of states within the League of Nations. Article 10 stated that the statute shall replace all other transit agreements concluded prior to 1 May 1921. Article 11 permitted governments to grant greater freedoms of transit than provided in the statute, if they chose to do so. Article 12 permitted governments to postpone temporarily the applications of the transit provisions in case their territory or parts of it still suffered from the devastation caused by the First World War. Article 13 provided for resolution of disputes regarding interpretation through the Permanent Court of International Justice. Article 14 permitted governments to refrain from applying reasonable transit provisions to territories that were either under populated or lacking in proper arrangements of the rule of law. Article 15 stated that different arrangements shall apply in League of Nations mandated territories.

Table of ratifications

See also
 Barcelona Convention and Statute on the Regime of Navigable Waterways of International Concern

Notes

External links
 text of the convention
Ratifications

Treaties concluded in 1921
Treaties entered into force in 1922
League of Nations treaties
Treaties of the Principality of Albania
Treaties of Antigua and Barbuda
Treaties of the First Austrian Republic
Treaties of Belgium
Treaties of Bosnia and Herzegovina
Treaties of the Kingdom of Bulgaria
Treaties of the Khmer Republic
Treaties of Chile
Treaties of Croatia
Treaties of the Czech Republic
Treaties of Denmark
Treaties of Estonia
Treaties of Fiji
Treaties of Finland
Treaties of the French Third Republic
Treaties of Georgia (country)
Treaties of the Weimar Republic
Treaties of the Kingdom of Greece
Treaties of the Kingdom of Hungary (1920–1946)
Treaties extended to British India
Treaties of Pahlavi Iran
Treaties of Mandatory Iraq
Treaties of the Kingdom of Italy (1861–1946)
Treaties of the Empire of Japan
Treaties of the Kingdom of Laos
Treaties of Latvia
Treaties of Lesotho
Treaties of Luxembourg
Treaties of Malta
Treaties of Mauritius
Treaties of Nepal
Treaties of the Netherlands
Treaties extended to New Zealand
Treaties of Nigeria
Treaties of Norway
Treaties of the Second Polish Republic
Treaties of the Kingdom of Romania
Treaties of Rwanda
Treaties of the Kingdom of Yugoslavia
Treaties of Slovakia
Treaties of Slovenia
Treaties of Spain under the Restoration
Treaties of Eswatini
Treaties of Sweden
Treaties of Switzerland
Treaties of Thailand
Treaties of Turkey
Treaties of the United Kingdom (1801–1922)
Treaties of Zimbabwe
1921 in Spain
Commercial treaties
Treaties extended to the Faroe Islands
Treaties extended to Greenland
Treaties extended to the Dominion of Newfoundland
Treaties extended to the Federated Malay States
Treaties extended to the Unfederated Malay States
Treaties extended to Mandatory Palestine
Treaties extended to Curaçao and Dependencies
Treaties extended to the Dutch East Indies
Treaties extended to Surinam (Dutch colony)
Treaties extended to Nyasaland
Treaties extended to the British Leeward Islands
Treaties extended to the British Windward Islands
Treaties extended to British Dominica
Treaties extended to the Colony of the Bahamas
Treaties extended to the Colony of Barbados
Treaties extended to the Crown Colony of Seychelles
Treaties extended to the Crown Colony of Trinidad and Tobago
Treaties extended to British Cyprus
Treaties extended to Basutoland
Treaties extended to the Bechuanaland Protectorate
Treaties extended to Bermuda
Treaties extended to British Burma
Treaties extended to British Ceylon
Treaties extended to the Gambia Colony and Protectorate
Treaties extended to British Honduras
Treaties extended to British Mauritius
Treaties extended to the British Solomon Islands
Treaties extended to British Somaliland
Treaties extended to Brunei (protectorate)
Treaties extended to the Falkland Islands
Treaties extended to the Colony of Fiji
Treaties extended to Gibraltar
Treaties extended to the Gilbert and Ellice Islands
Treaties extended to the Gold Coast (British colony)
Treaties extended to Guernsey
Treaties extended to the Isle of Man
Treaties extended to Jersey
Treaties extended to the Colony of Jamaica
Treaties extended to British Kenya
Treaties extended to the Crown Colony of Malta
Treaties extended to the New Hebrides
Treaties extended to the Colony and Protectorate of Nigeria
Treaties extended to the Pitcairn Islands
Treaties extended to Saint Helena, Ascension and Tristan da Cunha
Treaties extended to the Colony of Sierra Leone
Treaties extended to South Georgia and the South Sandwich Islands
Treaties extended to the Straits Settlements
Treaties extended to Swaziland (protectorate)
Treaties extended to Tanganyika (territory)
Treaties extended to the Kingdom of Tonga (1900–1970)
Treaties extended to the Emirate of Transjordan
Treaties extended to the Uganda Protectorate
Treaties extended to the Sultanate of Zanzibar
Treaties extended to British Hong Kong
Treaties extended to the French Mandate for Syria and the Lebanon
Treaties extended to British Cameroon
Treaties extended to British Togoland